Rengma, or Southern Rengma, is an Angami–Pochuri language spoken in Nagaland, India.

Names
Alternate names and dialect names of Rengma include Injang, Moiyui, Mon, Mozhumi, Nzong, Nzonyu, Rengma, Rengma Naga, Southern Rengma, Unza and Western Rengma (Ethnologue).

Dialects
Ethnologue reports the following dialects of Rengma.
Keteneneyu
Azonyu (Nzonyu, Southern Rengma)

Tseminyu is the principal dialect main center. Southern Rengma and Northern Rengma are reportedly inherently unintelligible.

Geographical distribution
Ethnologue reports the following locations for Rengma.

Tseminyü District, west-central Nagaland
15 villages of Karbi Anglong District, Assam
Manipur

References

Languages of Nagaland
Angami–Pochuri languages
Endangered languages of India